Ai Wenli (born March 1955) is a former Chinese politician who served as the Vice-Chairman of the Hebei Provincial Committee of the Chinese People's Political Consultative Conference. Previously, he served as the head of the Propaganda Department of the Chinese Communist Party Hebei Committee and the Mayor of Shijiazhuang. He was placed under investigation by the Central Commission for Discipline Inspection and the National Supervisory Commission shortly after his retirement. Ai is the first leader of vice-ministerial level to spontaneously hand himself in to the anti-corruption agency of China after the implementation of Supervision Law in March 2018.

Career
Ai was born in March 1955, and graduated from Tangshan Regional Business School. In 1971 he became a worker on a farm. Later he served as the County Head of Tanghai County, the Head of the Propaganda Department of the CCP Tangshan Committee, the director Bureau of Land Reclamation of Hebei, the Deputy Secretary and Head of the Organization Department of the CPC Shijiazhuang Committee, the Mayor of Chengde, and the Secretary of the CPC Chengde Committee.

During the Sanlu scandal in 2008, Ai was appointed as the Party Deputy Secretary and the Mayor of Shijiazhuang. In 2011, he was appointed as the Head of the Propaganda Department of the CPC Hebei Committee, until September 2015. He was appointed as the Vice-Chairman of the Hebei Provincial Committee of the Chinese People's Political Consultative Conference in 2015, and he retired in January 2018. In July 2018, Ai turned himself in to the Central Commission for Discipline Inspection and the State Supervisory Commission.

Investigation
On July 31, 2018, Ai Wenli was placed under investigation by the Central Commission for Discipline Inspection, the party's internal disciplinary body, and the National Supervisory Commission, the highest anti-corruption agency of the People's Republic of China, for "serious violations of regulations and laws". According to the report, he turned himself in. He was expelled from the Communist Party on October 19. On December 27, his trial was held at the Intermediate People's Court of Suzhou. He was accused of abusing his powers in former positions he held between 2005 and 2013 in Hebei to seek benefits for certain organizations and individuals in the matters of enterprise restructuring, project development and work arrangement. In return, he accepted money and property worth more than 64.78 million yuan ($10 million) either directly or from other connections.

On April 18, 2019, Ai was sentenced to 8 years in prison for bribery in Suzhou, Jiangsu. He was also fined 3 million yuan ($44.7 million).

References

1955 births
Chinese Communist Party politicians from Hebei
People's Republic of China politicians from Hebei
Political office-holders in Hebei
Living people
Politicians from Tangshan
Expelled members of the Chinese Communist Party